Peter Larsen may refer to:

 Peter Laurentius Larsen (1833–1915), Norwegian-American educator and founding president of Luther College
 Peter Orry Larsen (born 1990), Norwegian footballer
 Peter Thal Larsen, Dutch journalist
 Peter Larsen, former Minister for Food, Agriculture and Fisheries of Denmark
 Peter Larsen (media scholar) (born 1943), professor of media studies
 Peter Larsen (wrestler) (1904–1985), Danish Olympic wrestler

See also
Larsen (surname)
Peter Larsson (disambiguation)
Peter Larson (disambiguation)